Red House Painters is the second album by American band Red House Painters, released on May 24, 1993 by 4AD. The album is often referred to as Rollercoaster or Red House Painters I to distinguish it from the band's second eponymous album, often referred to as Bridge.
 
A double album, Red House Painters features fourteen songs culled from bandleader Mark Kozelek's back-catalog. The album received highly positive reviews from critics upon release, with praise directed at the album's melancholic instrumentation and emotional depth.

Background
The album follows Red House Painters' 1992 debut Down Colorful Hill, and the recording sessions spawned twenty-three songs culled from leader/producer Mark Kozelek's back-catalog, fourteen of which comprised the Rollercoaster album. Eight songs left over from the recording sessions would make up the band's second self-titled album. Kozelek's lyrics focus on themes of pain, desolation and loss, while musically the album runs from the folk-pop of "Grace Cathedral Park" to the shoegaze of "Mistress" to the stark "New Jersey" and onto the soundscapes of "Funhouse" and "Mother". Kozelek said of the recording sessions, "It was a nightmare, because the initial excitement of recording twenty-three songs became, 'one down, twenty-two to go' ... And I was nervous that people were now paying attention, but Ivo [Watts-Russell, 4AD label owner] made helpful suggestions and never demanded anything. If we went over budget, we went over budget." Watts-Russell also suggested the album be a double album, and compiled the track listing himself.

Kozelek discussed his views of the album in the foreword of the 2002 and revised 2008 editions of his book of lyrics, Nights of Passed Over: "... I know the Rollercoaster album is many people's favorite. But for me, it is and will always be the most difficult to get through. I hadn't heard it in years, and though there are some beautiful things I had forgotten about -- a delicate piano in "Things Mean a Lot", the way the band brings life to "Brown Eyes" midway through, and the chorus of "Strawberry Hill", which was sung by a group of strangers we gathered from outside the Divisadero Street studio where we were recording—what I remembered most, even when I look at the album's cover, is nine months of worry."

The album cover is a sepia-toned picture of the now-demolished Thunderbolt roller coaster at Coney Island.

Reception

In a contemporary review, James Greer of Spin wrote that Red House Painters "rewards patient listening with a rare and sublime ecstasy." The album peaked at number 63 upon its initial release on the UK Albums Chart in 1993.

Marc Hawthorne of The A.V. Club later cited Red House Painters as Mark Kozelek's "crowning achievement in a discography that has placed him alongside the greatest songwriters of all time". In a 5-star review, Jason Ankeny of AllMusic hailed the album as a "sprawling, remarkable set distinguished by Mark Kozelek's continuing maturation as a songwriter" and concluded that "the songs resonate with depth and poignancy, and rank as Kozelek's most fully realized collection of compositions." In September 2010, Pitchfork included "Katy Song" at number 162 on their Top 200 Tracks of the 1990s.

Track listing

Release history

Personnel
Images by W.K.V.L.

Though no other credits are printed on the release, the following is a de facto list of the performers on the album:
Red House Painters
Mark Kozelek – vocals, guitar, piano
Gorden Mack – guitar
Jerry Vessel – bass
Anthony Koutsos – drums

"Mistress" single
Although no commercial singles were ever released from the album, a promotional-only CD was issued for "Mistress" in the US in 1993. The single features a different mix of "Mistress" as well as the piano version, along with the album version of "Grace Cathedral Park". While the sleeve lists "Strawberry Hill" as the album version, it is in fact an edit, which removes roughly 50 seconds of guitar noise in the beginning of the song.

Warner Bros./4AD, PRO-CD-6108:
 "Mistress" (Remix) – 4:03
 "Grace Cathedral Park" – 3:51
 "Strawberry Hill" [Edit] – 6:44
 "Mistress" (Piano Version) – 4:31

References

Red House Painters albums
1993 albums
4AD albums
Albums produced by Mark Kozelek